Fotos is the debut album by German indie rock band Fotos, first released in September 2006.

Track listing

"Komm Zurück" ("Come Back") – 3:14
"So Fremd" ("So Strange") – 3:02
"Ich Bin Für Dich Da" ("I Am Here For You") – 3:16 
"Es Reißt Uns Auseinander" ("It Tears Us Apart") – 3:10 
"Viele" ("Lots") – 5:01 
"Giganten" ("Giants") – 4:53
"Du Löst Dich Auf" ("You Come Undone") – 2:44 
"Wiederhole Deinen Rhythmus" ("Repeat Your Rhythm") – 3:02
"Glücklich Eigentlich" ("Luckily Actually") – 3:04 
"Katharina" – 4:33

External links
Official website
Fotos at Last.fm

2006 albums
Virgin Records albums